Dmitrii Eduardovich Kozlovskii (formerly Nekhviadovich; , born 23 December 1999) is a Russian pair skater. With his skating partner, Aleksandra Boikova, he is the 2020 European champion, the 2021 World bronze medalist, the 2019 European bronze medalist, a six-time Grand Prix medalist (including four golds), the 2020 Russian national champion, and a four-time Russian national medalist.

On the junior level with Boikova, he is the 2017 Junior World silver medalist, the 2016–17 Junior Grand Prix Final bronze medalist, and the 2017 Russian junior national champion.

Personal life 
Kozlovskii was born on 23 December 1999 in Saint Petersburg, Russia. He has also used the surname Nekhviadovich.

Career

Early years 
Kozlovskii started learning to skate in 2004. After training as a single skater in Alexei Mishin's group, in July 2015 he joined Tamara Moskvina's group to learn pair skating.

Following a brief partnership with another skater, Kozlovskii teamed up in November 2015 with Aleksandra Boikova, who had just switched from singles. Artur Minchuk in Saint Petersburg became the pair's coach.

2016–2017 season: Silver at Junior Worlds 
Boikova/Kozlovskii's international debut came in September 2016 at a Junior Grand Prix (JGP) event in Russia, where they won the silver medal. They placed fourth in their next JGP assignment in Germany. These results qualified them to the 2016–17 Junior Grand Prix Final, held in December in Marseille, France. They won the bronze medal with a personal best score of 159.72. Later in the same month, they finished sixth competing on the senior level at the Russian Championships. They won the junior national title in February 2017.

In March, Boikova/Kozlovskii won silver at the 2017 World Junior Championships in Taipei, Taiwan. Ranked first in the short program and fourth in the free skate, they finished second to Australia's Ekaterina Alexandrovskaya / Harley Windsor with a deficit of 2.05 points.

2017–2018 season 
Boikova/Kozlovskii won two medals on the 2017 JGP series. First they won a silver in Riga, Latvia and then a bronze in Zagreb, Croatia. With these results, they qualified to the JGP Final, where they placed fifth.

In October 2017, Boikova/Kozlovskii competed at their first international senior event, the 2017 CS Minsk-Arena Ice Star, where they won the gold medal with their personal best score of 191.58 points. A month later, they skated their second Challenger event at the 2017 CS Warsaw Cup, where they won the silver medal.

At the 2018 Russian Championships, they placed fifth on the senior level and fourth at the junior event.

2018–2019 season: Bronze at Europeans 
Boikova/Kozlovskii started their season by winning two medals on the 2018–2019 ISU Challenger Series. First, they won the silver medal at the 2018 CS Lombardia Trophy and then the bronze medal at the 2018 CS Finlandia Trophy. In late October, Boikova/Kozlovskii made their Grand Prix debut at 2018 Skate Canada, where they placed fourth with a personal best score of 196.54 points. In late November, they competed at the 2018 Internationaux de France, where they won the bronze medal.

At the 2019 Russian Championships, the pair won the bronze medal after placing third in both programs.  Boikova's skating boots had broken down following the French Grand Prix, requiring her to break in new boots in short order.

Assigned to the 2019 European Championships, Boikova/Kozlovskii placed fourth in the short program, 0.12 points behind Nicole Della Monica / Matteo Guarise of Italy.  They earned their first score above seventy points.  In the free skate, Kozlovskii erred on their three-jump combination, but they otherwise skated cleanly, placing third in the free skate and winning the bronze medal overall with a score 0.14 points ahead of Della Monica/Guarise. Kozlovskii referred to the result as "a miracle.  Fate has forgiven me today. It gave me a scare, and then it has saved me."  Boikova said the two aimed to support each other whenever they made mistakes.

Boikova/Kozlovskii concluded the season at the 2019 World Championships, placing sixth in the short program after losing levels on their death spiral and step sequence.  They skated cleanly in the free program, placing sixth there and sixth overall.  Boikova remarked, "We did our best, and now we can relax and go to Disneyland tomorrow."

2019–2020 season: European and national titles 
After winning the silver medal at the 2019 Shanghai Trophy, Boikova/Kozlovskii began the Grand Prix at 2019 Skate Canada International.  They set a new personal best in the short program, narrowly taking the lead over Canadian national champions Moore-Towers/Marinaro and Russian national champions Tarasova/Morozov.  They won the free skate by a wider margin for their first Grand Prix gold medal.  Competing next at the 2019 Rostelecom Cup, they won the short program with a score of 80.14, only the second team to score above eighty points at that point in the season.  They won the free skate with another new personal best, beating Tarasova/Morozov for the second time that season.

Boikova/Kozlovskii's results qualified them to the Grand Prix Final in Torino, where they placed second in the short program behind reigning World Champions Sui/Han.  The free skate was less successfully, marked by errors on jump and throw elements as well as their final lift, resulting in them placing fifth in that segment and dropping to fourth overall.  Kozlovskii remarked, "We are not happy about the skate, but what can I do? It’s the sport. It happens, and we will work hard to make sure it doesn’t happen again."

Competing at the 2020 Russian Championships, Boikova/Kozlovskii placed second in the short program, three points behind Tarasova/Morozov, who also skated a clean program.  Boikova/Kozlovskii then won the free skate, winning their first Russian national title by 0.47 points, an occasion he called "something special and memorable."

In what would prove to be their final competition of the season, Boikova/Kozlovskii entered the 2020 European Championships as the title favourites and won the short program with a new world record score.  Winning the free program by a wide margin, they took the gold medal.  Despite this success, both described it as "one of the hardest free skatings we’ve done recently."  They had been assigned to compete at the World Championships in Montreal, but those were cancelled as a result of the coronavirus pandemic.

2020–2021 season: World bronze 
Boikova/Kozlovskii debuted their programs at the senior Russian test skates, saying they had missed performing for spectators. They were scheduled to compete in the third stage of the domestic Russian Cup but had to withdraw after Kozlovskii contracted COVID-19.  Following Kozlovskii's recovery, they competed at the fourth stage, where several throw errors caused them to finish behind new training mates Mishina/Galliamov and longtime domestic rivals Tarasova/Morozov. The competition occurred shortly after the death of Igor Moskvin, the husband of their primary coach Tamara Moskvina.

Shortly afterward, they competed on the Grand Prix at the 2020 Rostelecom Cup, attended mainly by Russian-based skaters to minimize pandemic travel.  They were second in the short program behind Mishina/Galliamov after making another throw error. They skated a clean free program to take their second consecutive gold medal at Rostelecom.  They subsequently withdrew from the fifth stage of the Russian Cup after Boikova came down with a cold.

At the 2021 Russian Championships, Boikova/Kozlovskii attempted to mount a title defense despite only having a week to prepare but encountered throw jump issues in both segments.  They placed second in the short program, behind a clean Tarasova/Morozov, after Boikova stepped out of their throw triple Lutz.  In the free skate, Boikova stepped out of the throw triple flip.  Second in that segment as well, they won the silver medal behind Tarasova/Morozov.

Following the national championships, Boikova/Kozlovskii participated in the 2021 Channel One Trophy, a televised event organized and held in lieu of the cancelled European Championships. They were selected for the Time of Firsts team captained by Evgenia Medvedeva.  They placed third in both segments of the competition, and the Time of Firsts team finished in second place.  Boikova/Kozlovskii did not participate in the Russian Cup Final.

Heading into the 2021 World Championships in Stockholm, Boikova/Kozlovskii were considered one of the favourites to win the pairs title. For the event, they prepared a new short program to music from the film Howl's Moving Castle, which Boikova called "a piece of art and not just a movie."  Skating cleanly, they placed first in the short program, winning a gold small medal. In the free skate, Boikova fell on her attempted triple toe loop and on their throw triple flip, and the pair placed fourth in that segment and dropped to the bronze medal position overall.

2021–2022 season: Beijing Olympics 
Boikova/Kozlovskii made their seasonal Grand Prix debut at the 2021 Skate America, where they were second in the short program behind Tarasova/Morozov. Boikova fell twice in the free skate, as a result of which they placed fourth in that segment and fell to the bronze medal position overall, finishing behind Tarasova/Morozov and Japan's Miura/Kihara. Kozlovskii assessed afterward that "not everything worked out, but it was a huge experience for us." They went on to win their second event, the 2021 Internationaux de France, aided by the withdrawal of second seeds Peng/Yang. Kozlovskii said they had "fulfilled our minimum task" by qualifying for the Grand Prix Final, despite errors in the free skate. The Final was subsequently cancelled due to restrictions prompted by the Omicron variant.

At the 2022 Russian Championships, Boikova/Kozlovskii placed second in both segments of the competition to take their second consecutive silver medal, 3.87 points behind rivals Mishina/Galliamov. Kozlovskii called it "a personal victory for us after some difficulties."

Boikova/Kozlovskii placed third in the short program at the 2022 European Championships in Tallinn after Boikova doubled on her planned triple jump. Skating cleanly in the free, they were also third in that segment, taking the bronze medal. Alluding to the short program era, Boikova suggested, "sometimes accidents happen for the better. Maybe, on the contrary, this mistake helped us to concentrate more on today's work." On January 20, they were officially named to the Russian Olympic team.

Competing at the 2022 Winter Olympics in the pairs event, Boikova/Kozlovskii placed fourth in the short program after Boikova had to put a hand down on the landing of their throw flip. In the free skate, Boikova underrotated a triple toe jump and stepped out of a throw triple loop, with the team remaining in fourth place overall. Both expressed disappointment with their results.

Programs 
(with Boikova)

Competitive highlights 
GP: Grand Prix; CS: Challenger Series;  JGP: Junior Grand Prix

With Boikova

Detailed results 
Small medals for short and free programs awarded only at ISU Championships.

With Boikova

Senior level

Junior level

References

External links 
 
 

1999 births
Living people
Russian male pair skaters
World Figure Skating Championships medalists
European Figure Skating Championships medalists
World Junior Figure Skating Championships medalists
Figure skaters from Saint Petersburg
Figure skaters at the 2022 Winter Olympics
Olympic figure skaters of Russia